Hull Creek may refer to:

Hull Creek (Lackawanna River), a stream in Lackawanna County, Pennsylvania
Hull Creek (Potomac River), a stream in Northumberland County, Virginia